Ryan Brunt may refer to:

Ryan Brunt (curler) (born 1985), American curler
Ryan Brunt (footballer) (born 1993), English professional footballer